The 2008 Kazakhstan First Division was the 14th edition of Kazakhstan First Division, the second level football competition in Kazakhstan. Unlike the previous years, number of teams were shortened, due to creation of reserve teams league for Premier League teams. Thus, this season 14 teams started to play against each other on home-away system. Two best teams gain promotion to the Premier League next season. League started on May 1 and finished on October 11

League table

External links
Final standings and results 
Clubs roster

Kazakhstan First Division seasons
2
Kazakhstan
Kazakhstan